Westward Bound is a 1944 American Western film directed by Robert Emmett Tansey and written by Elizabeth Beecher and Frances Kavanaugh. The film stars Ken Maynard, Hoot Gibson, Bob Steele, Betty Miles, Harry Woods and Weldon Heyburn. The film was released on January 17, 1944, by Monogram Pictures.

Plot

Cast           
Ken Maynard as Ken Maynard
Hoot Gibson as Hoot Gibson
Bob Steele as Bob Steele
Betty Miles as Enid Barrett
Harry Woods as Roger Caldwell
Weldon Heyburn as Albert Lane
Karl Hackett as Henry Wagner 
Hal Price as Jasper Tuttle
John Bridges as Ira Phillips
Roy Brent as Will
Frank Ellis as Judd
Curley Dresden as Monte
Al Ferguson as Curley
Charles Murray Jr. as Chip 
Dan White as Wade
Horace B. Carpenter as Dr. Bernard Adrian

References

External links
 
 Westward Bound at Turner Classic Movies

1944 films
1940s English-language films
American Western (genre) films
1944 Western (genre) films
Monogram Pictures films
Films directed by Robert Emmett Tansey
American black-and-white films
1940s American films